Since 1978, the Commonwealth Games have had a mascot in each edition.

See also
 List of Olympic mascots

References 

Mascots
Commonwealth Games
Lists of mascots